London Buses route 497 is a Transport for London contracted bus route in London, England. Running between Harold Hill and Harold Wood, it is operated by Stagecoach London.

History 
The route was first proposed in a review by Transport for London published in September 2016. A two-month consultation was held in 2017. It had been expected to start service in May 2019, however it was delayed. It began service on 25 January 2020. A review found that passenger numbers were insufficient for the route to be sustainable. In autumn 2021, Transport for London opened a consultation requesting opinions on if the route should be extended, or withdrawn.

In March 2022, Transport for London confirmed that the Sunday service would be withdrawn in the summer and that the route would be extended to Dagnam Park Square.

Current route
Route 497 operates via these primary locations:
 Harold Wood station 
 Gallows Corner Tesco
 Harold Hill, Hilldene Avenue
 Dagnam Park Square

Operation 
The route is operated at a frequency of one bus every thirty minutes during the day Monday to Saturday, and hourly in the early mornings and evenings. It does not run on Sundays. It is operated by Stagecoach London using Alexander Dennis Enviro200 MMC buses.

References 

Bus routes in London